Elephant Juice is a 1999 British drama film directed by Sam Miller.

Plot

Cast 
 Emmanuelle Béart - Jules
 Sean Gallagher - Billy
 Daniel Lapaine - Will
 Daniela Nardini - Daphne
 Mark Strong - Frank
 Kimberly Williams-Paisley - Dodie 
 Lennie James - Graham
 Lee Williams - George

References

External links 

1999 drama films
1999 films
British drama films
Films directed by Sam Miller
1990s English-language films
1990s British films